Ana Isabel Alós López (born May 11, 1969, in Huesca, Spain) is a Spanish politician and senator. She sits on the Spanish senate committee for monitoring and evaluating the agreements of senate reports on strategies against gender-based violence. She is also a member of the Permanent Deputation of Spain. She was elected member of the Cortes Generales on January 8, 2016.

Ana Alos Lopez attended the University of Zaragoza where she studied economic and later graduated with a BSc in Economics. She also has a master's degree in Business Admin and Management from Comillas Pontifical University.

In 2003, during the municipal elections of March 2003 she was elected councilor of Huesca. In 2011, after running two terms as city councilor was elected Mayor of Huesca. She is also the first woman to be elected mayor in the city of Huesca. After her term as Mayor, in 2015 she was elected into the Congress of Deputies with 39,747 votes approximately. During the general elections of 2015, she was reelected in to the Palacio de las Cortes, Madrid as member of congress.

She is a member of the Finance and Civil Service Commission and the Education and Sport Commission. In the general elections of April 28, 2019, she was elected senator for the province of Huesca.

References 

Living people
1969 births
Spanish politicians
Members of the 11th Congress of Deputies (Spain)
Members of the 13th Senate of Spain
Members of the 14th Senate of Spain
University of Zaragoza alumni
Comillas Pontifical University alumni